

Films

References

Films
LGBT
2000
2000-related lists